Elma Jane Dienda (born 16 November 1964 in Upington, Northern Cape, South Africa) is a Namibian politician and teacher. Currently a member Democratic Turnhalle Alliance which she joined four years after her resignation from the CoD, Dienda was a member of the National Assembly of Namibia from taking CoD's final spot in 2004 until CoD did not receive enough votes for her re-election in 2009. She is of South African and Malawian descent.

Career
Dienda is a teacher by profession, having earned an education diploma at the Windhoek College of Education and worked at Eldorado High School in Khomasdal. She also has a paralegal diploma from the Legal Assistance Centre. She received training as a counselor at Catholic AIDS Action.

Political positions
Dienda joined the Congress of Democrats in 1999, the year of its foundation. She also held the position of the secretary of the Women Democrats Party. In 2007, she opposed the election of Ben Ulenga as party president.

Dienda led a drive in the National Assembly which called for the distribution of condoms to prison inmates as a means of preventing the spread of HIV/AIDS. Dienda and other opposition politicians were shouted down, with Utoni Nujoma and Petrus Iilonga vocally opposing the idea. Several SWAPO members denied that sexual activities ever occurred in prisons.

The PDM legislator said she does not support husbands and wives claiming rape in marriage. Dienda was responding  to a point raised by the minister of home affairs, immigration, safety and security Albert Kawana, who asked whether there would be a conviction if boyfriends and girlfriends, or husbands and wives, claim rape when there is no semen and bodily fluids as part of the court evidence, during a parliament session in April 2022.

References

1964 births
Living people
People from Upington
Congress of Democrats politicians
Members of the National Assembly (Namibia)
Namibian people of Malawian descent
Namibian people of South African descent
21st-century Namibian women politicians
21st-century Namibian politicians
Women members of the National Assembly (Namibia)
Windhoek College of Education alumni